Chapel Street Estate is a residential area of Brierley Hill, West Midlands, England.

Although the Chapel Street Estate was only created in the 1960s, the actual site of the estate had been a dense residential area for at least 100 years previously.

Hundreds of terraced houses had been built on the site of Chapel Street during the 19th century, housing the many industrial workers who were being employed at new factories like the Round Oak Steel Works. But by the end of the Second World War, many of these houses were unfit for human habition and plans were soon being made for their demolition.

By the end of the 1960s, all of the old houses in the area had been demolished and replaced by a new housing estate that consisted entirely of council flats. There were eight tower blocks and approximately 15 smaller blocks that were between three and six storeys high. The road layout of the estate was also much better than before, and it was soon regarded as one of the best council estates in the Metropolitan Borough of Dudley (which had absorbed Brierley Hill in 1966).

.

Areas of Dudley
Brierley Hill
Housing estates in England